Philippe Mestrezat (October 14, 1618 in Geneva – February 1, 1690, in Geneva) was a Genevan Calvinist minister and professor at Geneva.

Life
He studied theology at the Geneva Academy, and became a pastor in 1644. He was nephew of Jean Mestrezat, pastor at Charenton.

He was chosen as successor at Geneva to Alexander Morus; but in doctrinal terms shared the sympathy of Morus for the doctrines of the Saumur Academy. His views were Amyraldist, and led him into conflict with the Company of Pastors. In the debates leading up to the imposition of the Helvetic Consensus he tried to moderate the formulation applied in Geneva; but the other cantons objected, and threatened to boycott the Academy.

Notes

1618 births
1690 deaths
Theologians from the Republic of Geneva
Calvinist and Reformed Christians